The 2013–14 Primera División season was the 123rd season of top-flight professional football in Argentina. It started on August 2, 2013 and ended on May 24, 2014. Twenty teams competed in the league, seventeen returning from the 2012–13 season and three promoted from the Primera B Nacional Championship (Championship winners Rosario Central, runners-up Gimnasia y Esgrima (LP) and 3rd place Olimpo). For first time Independiente did not compete in the Primera División championship.

In the first half of the season San Lorenzo became champion of the 2013 Torneo Inicial "Nietos Recuperados", winning the “Miguel Benancio Sánchez” League Cup. The winner of the 2014 Torneo Final "Nietos Recuperados", River Plate, won the "Presidente Raúl Alfonsín" League Cup. In the Superfinal, River Plate won the Campeonato Cup after a 1-0 victory over San Lorenzo in La Punta, San Luis.

Argentinos Juniors and All Boys were relegated to the Primera B Nacional Championship. The third relegated team was Colón, who lost a playoff match against Atlético de Rafaela

Format
There was two champions in the season. The champions (Torneo Inicial and Torneo Final winners) met in a season ending championship final to determine the super champion. The format for each tournament remained the same as in previous seasons.

As in the previous season the last three teams on the relegation (average) table were directly relegated.

Teams
The relegated teams of 2012–13 season were San Martín (SJ), Independiente and Unión. They played in the 2013–14 Primera B Nacional Championship. At the same time the 2012–13 Primera B Nacional Championship winners Rosario Central, runners-up Gimnasia y Esgrima (LP) and 3rd place Olimpo were promoted at the end of the season.

Stadia and locations

Statistics

Managerial changes

Interim Managers
Torneo Inicial
1.  Fabio Radaelli was interim manager in the 5th round.
2. Interim manager, but later promoted to full-time manager.
3.  Ignacio Carlos González was interim manager in the 11th round.
4. Interim manager.
Torneo Final
5. Interim manager.
6.  Roberto González was interim manager in the 14th round.
7. Interim manager.

Torneo Inicial
The Torneo Inicial was the first tournament of the season. It began on August 2 and ended on December 15, 2013. Originally the tournament should finish on December 8, but AFA decided to postpone two matches of the last round (Vélez Sarsfield-San Lorenzo and Newell's Old Boys-Lanús) one week as Lanús had to play the 2013 Copa Sudamericana final against Ponte Preta of Brazil.  San Lorenzo won the title with a 0–0 draw at Vélez Sarsfield as outgoing champions Newell's Old Boys were held 2–2 in Rosario. San Lorenzo topped the Torneo Inicial with 33 points from 19 matches, two more than Vélez Sarsfield, Newell's Old Boys and Lanús. It was San Lorenzo's 12th league title in the professional era and first since the 2007 Clausura championship.
Also in this tournament Colón were deducted six points after their denial to pay the fee that was agreed upon with Mexican side Atlante over Juan Carlos Falcón back in 2007. Atlante decided to take this issue to FIFA and they won the case.  Colón lost the appeal and were forced to pay US$600.000. 
Additionally, on November 18 (16th round) the Colón players refused to participate in the match against Atlético de Rafaela, due to a failure to pay the squad's wages. Finally, on December 10, AFA gave the victory to Atlético de Rafaela (0−1), but they did not deduct any points from Colón.

Standings

Results

Top goalscorers

Torneo Final
The Torneo Final was the second and final tournament of the season. It began on February 7 and ended on May 19, 2014. Colón was leader of the Torneo Final until the 11th round, then Estudiantes (LP), Gimnasia y Esgrima (LP) and River Plate started to fight for the lead of the tournament until the last round. In the last round River Plate trashed Quilmes 5-0 as Estudiantes (LP) and Gimnasia y Esgrima (LP) were beaten 2-1 by Tigre and 0-1 by Boca Juniors respectively. Finally River Plate won the Torneo Final with a five-point margin over Boca Juniors, Estudiantes (LP) and Godoy Cruz in joint second place. One of the fundamental moments in the title of River Plate was the victory 1-2 to Boca Juniors in the 10th round with a head goal of Ramiro Funes Mori in the last minutes of the match. This was their first away victory over Boca Juniors in 10 years. With Argentinos Juniors and All Boys relegated previously, the third relegation place had a dramatic final in the last round after Colón and Atlético de Rafaela scored injury-time winners to win their games, at home to Olimpo and away to Arsenal respectively, forcing a play-off match between them.At the end of the season Juan Sebastián Verón and Gabriel Heinze, captains of Estudiantes (LP) and Newell's Old Boys , finished their professional careers.

Standings

Results

Top goalscorers

Superfinal
The 2013-14 Superfinal was played between San Lorenzo, winners of the 2013 Torneo Inicial, and River Plate, winners of the 2014 Torneo Final. River Plate did not count on defender Éder Álvarez Balanta nor striker Teófilo Gutiérrez, as both players were called up by José Néstor Pekerman for the Colombia national team to train for the 2014 World Cup. San Lorenzo did not count on defender Carlos Valdés, who also was training with the Colombia national team, and Ignacio Piatti, who was recovering from an injury. River Plate defeated San Lorenzo 1–0 and as Super Champions they qualified to 2014 Copa Sudamericana and 2014 Supercopa Argentina. The only goal came from Germán Pezzella in the 73rd minute, a header after a free-kick from the left.

Details

 Buffarini (San Lorenzo) and Barovero (River Plate) finished the match as captains.

Relegation

The relegation (or average) table is the table that averages the points over the last 3 seasons (each season consisting of two tournaments, "Inicial" and "Final"). Teams that have recently been promoted will only have one or two seasons counted under this table (and therefore fewer games played), thus each point they score increases their average more than the teams that have 3 seasons played.

Source:†Colón deducted 6 points.

Relegation playoff
After three seasons, Colón and Atlético de Rafaela finished with the same average (142 points in 114 matches, Average 1.246). The tournament rules established that if two teams, at the end of the season, had the same average it was required a playoff game. Atlético de Rafaela won the match 0–1 and remained in the Primera División. In the other hand, after 19 seasons playing in the Primera División, Colón was relegated to the Primera B Nacional championship.

International qualification
Qualification for the 2014 Copa Sudamericana tournament was awarded to the winners of the 2013–14 Argentine Primera División and the 5 best teams of this aggregate table (if not qualified for 2014 Copa Libertadores second stage, or won the 2014 Torneo Final or were the aggregate table best team not yet qualified for the 2015 Copa Libertadores, or relegated).

Qualification for the 2015 Copa Libertadores tournament was awarded to the 2014 Torneo Final champion and the aggregate table best team not yet qualified. This aggregate table could also be used for award places for the 2015 Copa Libertadores if the 2014 Torneo de Transición champion is qualified and could be used as tiebreak for the 2013–14 Copa Argentina and the 2014 Copa Sudamericana best Argentine team berths.

At the end of the season Vélez Sarsfield and Boca Juniors tied the aggregate table best team with 61 points. Therefore, a playoff match between them was played on January 28, 2015. Boca Juniors won 1–0 and qualified to the 2015 Copa Libertadores Second Stage.

Copa Libertadores playoff

Boca Juniors qualified for 2015 Copa Libertadores second stage as Argentina 4.

References

External links
2013–14 Argentine Primera División season at Soccerway
Official regulations
Football-Lineups

1
Argentine Primera División seasons
p
p
p
p